Chilonopsis helena is an extinct species of air-breathing land snails, terrestrial pulmonate gastropod mollusks in the family Achatinidae. This species was endemic to Saint Helena. It is now extinct.

References

helena
Extinct gastropods
Gastropods described in 1833
Taxonomy articles created by Polbot